Ranigat (Pashto: راني ګټ) is a collection of 2nd century CE Buddhist ruins spread over an area of 4 square kilometers which  dates from the Gandhara civilization. Ranigat is located in Buner Valley of Pakistan's Khyber Pakhtunkhwa province.

According to archeologists, Ranigat remained the center of Buddhist art and culture for centuries. Ranigat has been a celebrated part of folklore, with songs and stories having been written about it.

Rani Gatt (lit. the queen of stones in Pashto) is a 2500-year-old Buddhist archaeological site  belonging to the Gandahara civilization located in Buner District of Khyber Pakhtunkhwa, Pakistan. Ranigat is a good example of the Buddhist past of the area. The site is located on top of a hill, accessible by climbing the stairs constructed by the Japanese. The main attractions include; Stupas, a big rock erected by the ancient people at some distance that they probably used to worship. The city or the town was beautifully designed and stones from the local mountains have been extensively used. Ranigat is easily accessible through M1 and N35. It is about 20 km away from Swabi and 100 km from Peshawar and Islamabad.

Etymology
The word Ranigat is the combination of two different languages ‘Rani’ and ‘gat’. ‘Rani’ is a Hindi word that means ‘Queen’ while ‘gat’ is a Pashto word which means a ‘huge rock’,
hence the archaeological site of Ranigat, meaning "Queen's Rock". The referenced rock is on top of a mountain that is visible from far distances.

According to the archeologists, Ranigat, a developed state, remained the center of Buddhist art and culture for centuries.

Ranigat, belonging to the period of first-sixth century AD and protected under the Antiquities Act 1975, has been a celebrated part of folklore – songs and stories of which still echo from the coffee-hued ruins in Totalai in the Buner District of Khyber Pakhtunkhwa, Pakistan.
The site of Ranigat is situated on top of a ridge, where the remains of the region's largest Buddhist monastic complex reside. Structures on the site include stupas, monasteries, shrines, drainage networks, and other buildings. Ranigat is a 2500-year-old Buddhist archaeological site belonging to the Gandhara civilization and is a good evidence of the Buddhist past of the area.

Access
The site is located in Nogram village of District Buner and can be reached by a small road from Nogram where an ample parking space for about 15 cars is available. From parking there are 500 stairs to the site constructed by the Japanese government. The main attractions include; Stupas, monasteries, drainage systems, and a big rock erected by the ancient people at some distance that they probably used to worship. The city was beautifully designed and stones from the local mountains have been extensively used. Ranigat is easily accessible through M1 or (Motorway) or N35. It is about 20 km away from Swabi and 100 km from Peshawar or Islamabad.

It is a big stone atop the local hill and partitions the two districts, Swabi and Buner district in the Khyber Pakhtoonkhawa province. The height of the Rani Gatt is roughly 40 meters and its width is almost 25 meters, giving the look of a small minaret. The local people visit this place and enjoy the wonderful view of the small, beautiful, and green villages of the district.

Conservation
Under excavation by a joint UNESCO-Japanese team since the 1980s, the site has had issues related to vandalism.  The site is now under surveillance and is surrounded by a barbed-wire fence.

This site was added to the UNESCO World Heritage Tentative List on January 30, 2004, in the Cultural category.

See also 

 Takht Bhai (Another historic site in Mardan)

Notes

References 
Archaeological Site of Ranigat - UNESCO World Heritage Centre Retrieved 2009-03-03.
Ranigat: 2nd to 6th Century AD Retrieved 2009-03-03.

External links
 UNESCO Report on Ranigat
 RaniGat on Facebook

Pakistani culture
Ancient Central Asia
Archaeological sites in Khyber Pakhtunkhwa
Buner District